The 2019 NextEra Energy 250 was a NASCAR Gander Outdoors Truck Series race held on February 15, 2019. Contested over 111 laps due to an overtime finish, on the  asphalt superspeedway. It was the first race of the 2019 NASCAR Gander Outdoors Truck Series season.

Entry list

Practice

First practice

Final practice

Qualifying

Qualifying results

Race

Race results

Stage Results
Stage One
Laps: 25

Stage Two
Laps: 25

Final Stage Results

Laps: 61

References

NextEra Energy 250
NextEra Energy 250
NASCAR races at Daytona International Speedway